Laurent Daniel Chifita (born 3 August 1943) is a former long-distance runner. He competed in the marathon at the 1964 Summer Olympics representing Northern Rhodesia.

References

External links
 

1943 births
Living people
Northern Rhodesia people
Athletes (track and field) at the 1964 Summer Olympics
Zambian male long-distance runners
Zambian male marathon runners
Olympic athletes of Northern Rhodesia
Place of birth missing (living people)